"Too Good to Not Believe" is a song by Brandon Lake and Bethel Music, which was released on May 21, 2021, as the lead single to Bethel Music's thirteenth live album, Homecoming (2021). The song was written by Lake, Chris Davenport, Cody Carnes, and Josh Silverberg. David Whitworth handled the production of the single.

"Too Good to Not Believe" peaked at number 17 on the US Hot Christian Songs chart published by Billboard.

Background
On May 14, 2021, Bethel Music released the music video of "Too Good to Not Believe" with Brandon Lake on YouTube. Lake and Bethel Music officially released the song as a single on May 21, 2021. On September 10, 2021, Lake alongside Jenn Johnson released the radio version of "Too Good to Not Believe".

Writing and development
Brandon Lake shared the story behind the song, saying it came out of a conversation between Cody Carnes, Chris Davenport and him about the miracles they had seen. Lake shared that while Joshua Silverberg was not present when they had written the song, he was credited on account of being an inspiration to them for the number of healings he had seen. Lake quoted Silverberg saying "God heals because he loves. It's in his nature, it's in his character. It's what he does, and he's never stopped healing."

Composition

Commercial performance
"Too Good to Not Believe" debuted at No. 33 on the US Hot Christian Songs chart dated June 5, 2021, concurrently charting at No. 7 on the Christian Digital Song Sales chart.

"Too Good to Not Believe" debuted at number 50 on the US Christian Airplay chart dated October 30, 2021.

Music videos
Bethel Music released the live music video of "Too Good to Not Believe" with Brandon Lake leading the song at Bethel Church through their YouTube channel on May 14, 2021. On September 24, 2021, Bethel Music released the official lyric video of the song on YouTube.

Track listing

Charts

Weekly charts

Year-end charts

Release history

Cody Carnes and Brandon Lake version

Cody Carnes and Brandon Lake released a studio-recorded version of "Too Good to Not Believe" as a single on May 28, 2021.

Accolades

Commercial performance
"Too Good to Not Believe" debuted at number 44 on the US Christian Airplay chart. The song went on to peak at number 43 and has spent a total of three consecutive weeks on the chart.

"Too Good to Not Believe" debuted at No. 45 on the US Hot Christian Songs chart dated February 1, 2022.

Music videos
On May 28, 2021, the audio video of "Too Good to Not Believe" was published on Cody Carnes's YouTube channel, as well as the live performance video of the song.

Track listing

Personnel
Studio version credits adapted from AllMusic.

 Dan Alber — bass
 Cody Carnes — primary artist, vocals
 Chad Chrisman — A&R
 Austin Davis — drums, producer, programmer
 Garrett Davis — A&R
 Sam Gibson — mastering engineer, mixing
 Brandon Lake — primary artist, vocals
 Casey Moore — acoustic guitar, electric guitar
 Micah Nichols — vocal engineer
 Skye Reedy — background vocals
 Aaron Robertson — keyboards, programmer
 Sam Westhoff — vocal engineer

Live version credits adapted from AllMusic.

 Dan Alber — bass
 Tyler Carino — assistant engineer
 Cody Carnes — acoustic guitar, primary artist, producer, vocals
 Chad Chrisman — A&R
 Austin Davis — producer, programmer
 Garrett Davis — A&R
 Sam Gibson — mastering engineer, mixing
 Kari Jobe — background vocals
 Casey Moore — electric guitar
 Jack Nellis — vocal engineer
 Aaron Robertson — programmer
 Jessica Sheppard — keyboards
 Bobby Strand — electric guitar, keyboards
 Joe Volk — drums

Charts

Release history

Other versions
 Tribl and Maverick City Music released their live version of the song featuring Lizzie Morgan, Cecily, and Melvin Crispell III, as a promotional single from their album, Tribl Nights Anthologies (2022).

References

External links
  on PraiseCharts

 

2021 singles
Bethel Music songs
Brandon Lake songs
Cody Carnes songs
Songs written by Brandon Lake
Songs written by Cody Carnes